Andrei Bursuc (born 23 May 1997) is a Moldovan footballer who plays as a midfielder for Dinamo-Auto in the Moldovan National Division.

His father Iulian Bursuc is a former professional footballer. They played alongside each other in Sfântul Gheorghe in 2013.

References

External links

1997 births
Living people
Footballers from Chișinău
Moldovan footballers
FC Sfîntul Gheorghe players
FC Dacia Chișinău players
FC Dinamo-Auto Tiraspol players
FK Kauno Žalgiris players
FC Codru Lozova players
FC Zimbru Chișinău players
Speranța Nisporeni players
CSF Bălți players
Moldovan Super Liga players
A Lyga players
Association football midfielders
Moldovan expatriate footballers
Expatriate footballers in Lithuania
Moldovan expatriate sportspeople in Lithuania